Battery train may refer to:

Battery electric multiple unit
Accumulator railcar
Drumm Battery Train
Battery locomotive
Model railway
Ultra light rail
Coventry Very Light Rail